Onion skin may refer to:
 onionskin, thin typewriter paper
 "Onion Skin" (song), a single by Australian band Boom Crash Opera
 onion skinning, animation technique
 Onion Skin (film)